Haavassoo Nature Reserve is a nature reserve which is located in Saare County, Estonia.

The area of the nature reserve is 401 ha.

The protected area was founded in 2006 on the basis of Haavassoo Protected Area.

References

Nature reserves in Estonia
Geography of Saare County